The Indianapolis Indians are a Minor League Baseball team of the International League (IL) and the Triple-A affiliate of the Pittsburgh Pirates. They are located in Indianapolis, Indiana, and play their home games at Victory Field, which opened in 1996. The Indians previously played at Owen J. Bush Stadium from 1931 to 1996 and at two versions of Washington Park from 1902 to 1931.

Indianapolis is the second-oldest minor league franchise in American professional baseball (after the Rochester Red Wings). The team originated in 1902 as members of the American Association (AA), which was an independent league at the time but was granted Class A status in 1903. Since then, the Indians have played at the highest level of Minor League Baseball, though the terminology has changed. Indianapolis remained in the AA until the league disbanded after the 1962 season. They were briefly members of the International League (1963) and Pacific Coast League (1964–1968) before returning to the revived American Association in 1969. When the league dissolved a second time after the 1997 season, the Indians rejoined the IL in 1998. In conjunction with Major League Baseball's restructuring of the minors in 2021, they were shifted to the Triple-A East, but this was renamed the International League in 2022.

Indianapolis has won 14 league championships. They were American Association champions twelve times (1902, 1908, 1917, 1928, 1949, 1956, 1982, 1986, 1987, 1988, 1989, and 1994). The Indians have won the International League championship twice (1963 and 2000). They went on to win two Little World Series (1917 and 1928), two Junior World Series (1949 and 1956), two Triple-A Classics (1988 and 1989), and one Triple-A World Series (2000).

History

Prior professional baseball in Indianapolis

Indianapolis, Indiana, has been home to professional baseball teams since the late 19th century. The city's first Minor League Baseball team was the Indianapolis Blues, who played in the League Alliance in 1877. They joined the major league ranks in 1878 as members of the National League. After a five-year hiatus, they were followed by several teams called the Indianapolis Hoosiers. The first Hoosiers played in the major league American Association in 1884. The second Hoosiers were members of the minor Western League in 1885. The third Hoosiers were part of the National League from 1887 to 1889. Other minor league Hoosiers played in the Western League/minor American League in 1892 and from 1894 to 1900 and in the Western Association in 1901.

American Association (1902–1962)

In 1902, Bill Watkins and Charles Ruschaupt established the Indianapolis Indians as charter members of a new minor league American Association (AA). The league was an independent or "outlaw league" outside the umbrella of the National Association of Professional Baseball Leagues. The circuit was granted Class A status, the highest level of the minors, in 1903. Since then, the Indians have remained at the top level of Minor League Baseball, though the terminology has changed: Class A (1903–1911), Double-A (1912–1945), and Triple-A (since 1946). The Indians' first home ballpark was East Washington Park.

The 1902 Indians, managed by Watkins, won the first American Association championship with a 96–45 record, two games ahead of the second-place Louisville Colonels. The team was ranked as the 27th greatest minor league baseball team of all-time by baseball historians in 2001.

Ruschaupt became the principal owner in 1904, and Indianapolis began playing at West Washington Park in 1905. The Indians won their next AA pennant in 1908 with a 92–61 season, four games ahead of Louisville, under manager Charlie Carr. Sol Meyer and Sol Kiser purchased the team in 1913 but sold the team to James C. McGill and William G. Smith Sr. in 1914. McGill became the principal owner in 1917 and Smith in 1921.

Led by Jack Hendricks, the 1917 Indians won a third AA title with a 90–63 season, which placed them two-and-a-half games ahead of Louisville and the St. Paul Saints. The pennant win qualified Indianapolis for the Little World Series against the champions of the International League, the Toronto Maple Leafs. The Indians won the best-of-seven series, 4–1.

James A. Perry purchased the club in 1927. He died in a plane crash two years later, and his brother, Norman Perry, assumed ownership in 1929. Late in the 1931 season, the team moved to Perry Stadium, which was renamed Victory Field in 1942 and Bush Stadium in 1967. The 1928 Indians, who were managed by Bruno Betzel, won a fourth AA pennant by finishing two-and-a-half games ahead of the Minneapolis Millers at 99–68. They then defeated the Rochester Red Wings, 5–1, in the Little World Series.

From 1936 to 1946, Indianapolis qualified for the American Association playoffs on six occasions, but failed to win a championship. Meanwhile, Frank E. McKinney and Owen J. "Donie" Bush purchased the team in December 1941. The Indians entered into their first major league affiliation in 1939 and 1940 as the top farm club of the Cincinnati Reds. They returned to being an unaffiliated team from 1942 to 1945 before affiliating with the Boston Braves in 1946.

Indianapolis became the Triple-A affiliate of the Pittsburgh Pirates in 1947. The 1948 Indians posted a 100–54 record, a franchise high, but were eliminated in the playoff semifinals by St. Paul. The team was ranked as the 85th greatest minor league team in a 2001 ranking. Al López, who had managed the 1948 club, led the 1949 Indians back to the playoffs. They defeated Minneapolis, 4–3, in the semifinals and the Milwaukee Brewers, 4–3, in the final round, to win their first playoff title and fifth AA championship. In the Junior World Series, a successor to the Little World Series, Indianapolis defeated the Montreal Royals, 4–2. They made one more playoff appearance as a Pirates farm club in 1950 but lost in the championship finals.

The Cleveland Indians purchased the team in 1952, and made them their Triple-A affiliate. Over the five-year relationship, Indianapolis qualified for the playoffs three times. They lost in the semifinals in 1953, lost the 1954 finals, and won the American Association championship in 1956. On the heels of a 92–62 campaign, manager Kerby Farrell's Indians defeated Minneapolis, 4–3, in the semifinals before winning their sixth AA title over the Denver Bears, 4–0. They capped off the season by sweeping Rochester, 4–0, to win the Junior World Series.

Having incurred significant financial losses, Cleveland elected to sell the team after the 1955 season. The Indianapolis community rallied to save the Indians by purchasing 20,182 shares of stock valued at $10 each, which allowed Indians, Inc., to purchase the club in December. The affiliation between the major and minor league Indians remained intact until the teams parted ways after the 1956 season.

Indianapolis held a brief three-year affiliation with the Chicago White Sox from 1957 to 1959, with their only winning season occurring in the final season. This was followed by even shorter stints as the Triple-A affiliate of the Philadelphia Phillies in 1960 and the Cincinnati Reds in 1961. The 1961 team qualified for the playoffs but were ousted in the semifinals. The Indians rejoined the Chicago White Sox organization in 1962 and experienced another semifinal playoff exit in the first year of the affiliation. The American Association disbanded after the 1962 season.

International League (1963)

The Indians became members of the Triple-A International League (IL) in 1963 and retained their affiliation with the White Sox. Led by Rollie Hemsley, the 1963 Indians clinched the Southern Division title with an 86–67 record. They defeated the Syracuse Chiefs, 4–1, in the playoff semifinals before winning the International League championship over the Atlanta Crackers, 4–2. With the addition of Indianapolis and the Little Rock Travelers to the IL, the westernmost teams in the loop, team travel costs increased. At the 1963 Winter Meetings, major league teams refused to continue paying to defray these additional costs, so Indianapolis and Little Rock were expelled from the league.

Pacific Coast League (1964–1968)

The Pacific Coast League welcomed Indianapolis and Little Rock as members in 1964. Though they became the easternmost teams in the league, its two-division alignment helped to keep travel costs down. The Indians continued to serve as the top farm club of the Chicago White Sox through 1967, but they were unable to return to the postseason during the affiliation. They became part of the Cincinnati Reds' organization for a third time in 1968.

American Association (1969–1997)

The American Association was revived in 1969, and the Indians rejoined the league as the Triple-A affiliate of the Cincinnati Reds. Through 1982, the team qualified for the AA playoffs on three occasions via winning Eastern Division titles. They lost the 1971 league title in a best-of-seven series to the Denver Bears, 4–3. The 1974 championship series also went the full seven games with Indianapolis losing to the Tulsa Oilers. The 1978 team was denied a championship, losing to the Omaha Royals, 4–1. George Scherger managed the 1982 Indians to a fourth Eastern Division title as a Reds affiliate with a 75–61 campaign. They then defeated Omaha, 4–2, for the AA championship.

Indianapolis became part of the Montreal Expos organization in 1984 in what would become one of the most successful periods in team history. Though they were eliminated in the semifinals in 1984, the Indians won four consecutive American Association championships from 1986 to 1989. Manager Joe Sparks was at the helm for the first three of these titles. The 1986 Indians won the division with an 80–62 record. They won the AA championship versus the Denver Zephyrs, 4–3. The 1987 team placed second in the division, which gave them for a playoff berth. They beat the Louisville Redbirds, 3–2, in the semifinals and then won another league championship over Denver, 4–1. Sparks led the 1988 Indians to the Eastern Division title on a 89–53 season. In a single round of playoffs, they defeated Omaha, 3–1, for the league crown. From 1988 to 1991, American Association teams participated in interleague play with teams from the International League in a partnership called the Triple-A Alliance, and the season culminated in the Triple-A Classic, a best-of-seven postseason championship between the leagues' champions. Indianapolis won the first of these against Rochester, 4–2. Manager Tom Runnells' 1989 team ended the season with an 87–59 record and the Eastern Division title. They defeated Omaha, 3–2, for their fourth consecutive American Association championship. In the Triple-A Classic, the Indians swept the Richmond Braves, 4–0.

Indianapolis affiliated with Cincinnati for the fourth time in 1993. In 1994, Marc Bombard managed the team to a first-place 86–57 mark. The won the semifinals over Louisville, 3–0, and bested the Nashville Sounds, 3–1, for another league championship. The Indians made return trips to the postseason over the next three years but suffered semifinal eliminations in 1995 and 1997 and a finals loss in 1996. After 66 seasons at Bush Stadium, the Indians left the ballpark for the new $20-million Victory Field in downtown Indianapolis' White River State Park on July 11, 1996.

International League (1998–present)
The American Association disbanded after the 1997 season, and its teams were absorbed by the two remaining Triple-A leagues—the International League (IL) and Pacific Coast League. Indianapolis returned to the IL, of which they had previously been members in 1963. They remained as affiliates of the Cincinnati Reds through 1999.

In 2000, the team entered into a new partnership with the Milwaukee Brewers. Steve Smith led the 2000 Indians to the Western Division title with an 81–63 record. They defeated the Durham Bulls, 3–2, in the semifinals before winning the International League championship versus the Scranton/Wilkes-Barre Red Barons, 3–2. The Indians met the Memphis Redbirds, champions of the Pacific Coast League in the Triple-A World Series, winning 3–1. Sub-.500 finishes during the next four seasons kept the team from returning to the postseason as a Brewers affiliate and prompted the team to end their affiliation with Milwaukee.

The Indians became the Triple-A affiliate of the Pittsburgh Pirates in 2005 after having previously been in their farm system in 1951. They qualified for the IL playoffs with a wild card berth, advanced to the finals by defeating the Buffalo Bisons, 3–2, but lost the championship to the Toledo Mud Hens, 3–0. the 2016 team finished the season tied for first-place in the Western Division with Toledo. On September 5, the Indians lost a one-game playoff against the Mud Hens for the division title, 4–0, which eliminated them from postseason contention. Indianapolis won back-to-back Western Division titles in 2012 and 2013 but lost in the semifinal round each time.

At the end of the 2015 season, Indianapolis was tied with the Columbus Clippers for first. Per the league's playoff procedures, the teams were declared co-champions of the Western Division, and the Indians lost the tiebreaker to be seeded as the wild card team. The won their semifinals series against the Scranton/Wilkes-Barre RailRiders, 3–0, but lost the IL title versus Columbus Clippers, 3–2. They returned to the postseason in 2017 as Western Division champions but were eliminated in the semifinals by Durham, 3–1. The Indians did not qualify for the postseason from 2018 to 2019. The start of the 2020 season was initially postponed due to the COVID-19 pandemic before being cancelled altogether.

In conjunction with Major League Baseball's restructuring of Minor League Baseball in 2021, the Indians were placed in the Triple-A East. They also extended their Professional Development License with Pittsburgh through 2030. No playoffs were held to determine a league champion; instead, the team with the best regular-season record was declared the winner. Indianapolis ended the season in 11th place with a 57–62 record. However, 10 games that had been postponed from the start of the season were reinserted into the schedule as a postseason tournament called the Triple-A Final Stretch in which all 30 Triple-A clubs competed for the highest winning percentage. Indianapolis finished the tournament tied for 18th place with a 4–5 record. In 2022, the Triple-A East became known as the International League, the name historically used by the regional circuit prior to the 2021 reorganization.

Season-by-season records

Roster

Achievements

Awards 

The franchise has been awarded these honors by Minor League Baseball.

Eighteen players and nine managers won league awards in recognition for their performance with Indianapolis in the American Association.

One player won a league award in recognition for his performance with Indianapolis in the Pacific Coast League.

Seven players have won league awards in recognition for their performance with Indianapolis in the International League.

Hall of Famers

Thirteen former Indians have been elected to the National Baseball Hall of Fame based on their performance in or contributions to Major League Baseball.

Radio and television
Howard Kellman is the long-standing "Voice of the Tribe", calling play-by-play for all but two seasons (1975 and 1980) since 1974. All Indians home and road games are broadcast on WNDE Fox Sports 1260 AM. Live audio broadcasts are also available online through the team's website and the MiLB First Pitch app. Some home games can be viewed on WTTV.2 The Dot, WISH-TV 8, and MyINDY-TV 23. All home and road games can be viewed through the MiLB.TV subscription feature of the official website of Minor League Baseball, with audio provided by a radio simulcast.

Name controversy
In July 2020, a year before Major League Baseball's similarly-named Cleveland Indians changed their moniker to the "Guardians" in 2021 (which took hold for the 2022 MLB season), Indianapolis management said it would form a committee to determine whether a change was necessary, based on dialogue with local organizations and community members. By the time Cleveland changed their name in July 2021, Indianapolis announced that they had no immediate plans for a name change. Although they acknowledged that, when the team was initially formed, the name was a play on Indianapolis itself, the moniker had evolved to include more Native American references in their logo and marketing. Meanwhile, the primary newspaper covering the team, the Indianapolis Star, started to report stories and results about the team using only the city's name, without the supposedly controversial nickname. In addition, Carolina Castoreno-Santana, executive director of the American Indian Center of Indiana, said the Indianapolis Indians should change their name, arguing that the indigenous people were "overwhelmingly" in favor of changing the name.  In February 2022, it was announced that the Indianapolis Indians would retain their long-held nickname and partner with local Indian tribes (the Miami Nation of Indiana).

Notes

References
Specific

General

External links

 
 Statistics from Baseball-Reference
 A Player to Be Named Later, a 2005 documentary film about the team

 
1902 establishments in Indiana
American Association (1902–1997) teams
Baseball teams established in 1902
Boston Braves minor league affiliates
Chicago White Sox minor league affiliates
Cincinnati Reds minor league affiliates
Cleveland Guardians minor league affiliates
International League teams
Milwaukee Brewers minor league affiliates
Montreal Expos minor league affiliates
Pacific Coast League teams
Philadelphia Phillies minor league affiliates
Pittsburgh Pirates minor league affiliates
Professional baseball teams in Indiana
Triple-A East teams